Colonel Tateo Katō's Flying Squadron (64th Sentai) and a.k.a. Colonel Kato's Falcon Squadron is a 1944 black and white Japanese film directed by Kajiro Yamamoto.

It is a war film with special effects directed by Eiji Tsuburaya, best known for his work on the Godzilla and Ultraman franchises.

Cast 
 Susumu Fujita as Tateo Katō

References

External links 
 
 

World War II films made in wartime
Japanese black-and-white films
1944 films
Films directed by Kajiro Yamamoto
Japanese aviation films
Southeast Asia in fiction
Japanese war films
1944 war films
Japanese World War II films
World War II aviation films

zh:加藤隼戰鬥隊#電影『加藤隼戰鬥隊』